St. James Episcopal Church is an Episcopal church in Greeneville, Tennessee, United States.

The St. James congregation was organized in 1842 as the "Greeneville Parish, Greene County," by a small group of faithful Episcopalians who gathered for worship at the Greene County Courthouse. They were admitted to the 1848 Convention of the Episcopal Diocese of Tennessee, and subsequently were approved as a formal parish at the diocesan convention in July 1849.

The parish constructed its present church building in 1850, modified it in 1894, and further enlarged the structure in 1951. It is said to be one of Tennessee's oldest churches.

Between 1852 and 1901, St. James experienced great turmoil, having to close its doors for 18 months from 1873 to 1875. During this period St. James lapsed into mission status and did not regain its standing as a parish until 1957.

Clergy
1850–52 The Rev. William H. Good, Vicar
1852–54 The Rev. W. P. Gahagan, Vicar
1854–60 The Rev. W. M. Steel, Vicar
1860–69 The Rev. William Mowbray, Vicar
1869–72 The Rev. T. Duncan, Vicar
1892–95 The Rev. Alexander C. Killeffer, Vicar
1927–37 The Ven. Henry T. Geiger, Archdeacon
1937–39 The Rev. Joseph L. Kellerman, Vicar
1939–45 The Rev. Charles Boyd Romain, Vicar
1945–48 The Rev. Eric Sutcliffe Greenwood, Vicar
1948–54 The Rev. Armand T. Eyler, Vicar
1954–56 The Rev. Thomas Hall Carson, Jr. Vicar
1957–61 The Rev. Warren Hugh Steele, Rector
1961–64 The Rev. Joseph T. Boulet, Rector
1964–81 The Rev. Robert Alan McMillan, Rector
1983–86 The Rev. Patrick C. Larkin, Rector
1986–98 The Rev. Rowland A. Clarkson, Rector
1999 The Rev. Willis W. H. Poyser, Rector
2002–04 The Rev. Jack Franklyn Wilcox, Jr., Rector
2005–16 The Rev. Carolyn W. Isley, Rector
2018–present The Rev. Dr. Kenneth H. Saunders III, Rector

Mater Purissima
In 1950, the parish commissioned ecclesiastical artist Sister Mary Veronica (Community of St. Mary) to paint an altarpiece. The oil and gold painting, entitled Mater Purissima (Latin: purest mother), emulates the medieval styles of fifteenth-century European masters Friars Angelico and Lippi. The colors are traditional—red symbolizing the Kingship of Our Lord Jesus Christ, and blue representing the Purity of His Blessed Mother, Saint Mary.

Ralph Adams Cram (1863-1942), one of the preeminent ecclesiastical architects of the twentieth century, considered Mary Veronica as the greatest iconographer of his time. Cram once said that she was the only artist for whom he would willingly alter his designs. 
Sister Mary Veronica was born Ella McCullough and lived from 1864 to 1965. Her paintings are on display in select cathedrals and churches throughout the United States and overseas. Saint James is most fortunate to enjoy one of Mary Veronica's works.

Further reading
Doughty, Richard Harrison (1975). Greeneville: One hundred year portrait (1775-1875) (pp. 141–150). Kingsport, TN: Kingsport Press. LCCN: 74–28678.
Johnson, Mayme Hart (1986). A treasury of Tennessee churches (p. 31). Nashville, TN: J. M. Productions. .
Patrick, James (1981). Architecture in Tennessee, 1768-1897 (p. 111).  Knoxville, TN: University of Tennessee Press. .

External links

St. James Episcopal Church website

Episcopal churches in Tennessee
Churches completed in 1850
19th-century Episcopal church buildings
Religious organizations established in 1842
Carpenter Gothic church buildings in Tennessee
Buildings and structures in Greene County, Tennessee
1842 establishments in Tennessee
Greeneville, Tennessee